Elections were held in Western Visayas for seats in the House of Representatives of the Philippines on May 9, 2016.

Summary

Aklan
Teodorico Haresco Jr. is the incumbent. He is running against former governor Carlito Marquez.

Antique
Paolo Everardo Javier is the incumbent.

Capiz
Each of Capiz's two legislative districts will elect each representative to the House of Representatives. The candidate with the highest number of votes wins the seat.

1st District
Antonio Del Rosario is the incumbent but ineligible for reelection. Instead, he ran for governor.

≥u

2nd District
Fredenil Castro is the incumbent and running unopposed.

Guimaras
Joaquin Carlos Rahman A. Nava is the incumbent. His party nominated his wife Ma. Lucille Nava for the seat governor Carlito Marquez.

Iloilo
Each of Iloilo's five legislative districts will elect each representative to the House of Representatives. The candidate with the highest number of votes wins the seat.

1st District
Oscar "Richard" Garin, Jr. is the incumbent.

2nd District
Arcadio Gorriceta is the incumbent.

3rd District
Arthur Defensor Jr. is the incumbent and running unopposed.

4th District
Hernan G. Biron Jr. is the incumbent but he is not seeking for reelection. His party nominated former congressman Ferjenel Biron.

≥u

5th District
Neil Tupas, Jr. is the incumbent but ineligible for reelection. He is running for vice-governor instead. His party nominated his wife Yvonne Angeli Tupas, who is also running against his brother, incumbent vice governor Raul Tupas.

≥u

Iloilo City
Jerry Treñas is the incumbent.

≥u

References

External links
Official COMELEC results 2016
COMELEC - Official website of the Philippine Commission on Elections (COMELEC)
NAMFREL - Official website of National Movement for Free Elections (NAMFREL)
PPCRV - Official website of the Parish Pastoral Council for Responsible Voting (PPCRV)

2016 Philippine general election
Lower house elections in Western Visayas